Reaumuria is a genus of flowering plants in the family Tamaricaceae, found in North Africa, Sicily, Anatolia, the Middle East, the Caucasus, Pakistan, Central Asia, Mongolia, Tibet, and northern China. They tend to be perennial xerophytic and halophytic shrubs or subshrubs.

Species
Currently accepted species include:

Reaumuria alternifolia (Labill.) Britten
Reaumuria atreki Botsch. & Zuckerw.
Reaumuria babataghi Botsch.
Reaumuria botschantzevii Zuckerw. & Kurbanov
Reaumuria floyeri S.Moore
Reaumuria fruticosa Boiss.
Reaumuria halophila Podlech
Reaumuria hirtella Jaub. & Spach
Reaumuria kaschgarica Rupr.
Reaumuria kermanensis Bornm.
Reaumuria korovinii Botsch. & Lincz.
Reaumuria kuznetzovii Sosn. & Manden.
Reaumuria minfengensis D.F.Cui & M.J.Zhong
Reaumuria negevensis Zohary & Danin
Reaumuria oxiana (Ledeb.) Boiss.
Reaumuria persica (Boiss.) Boiss.
Reaumuria reflexa Lipsky
Reaumuria sivasica Kit Tan & Yildiz
Reaumuria sogdiana Kom.
Reaumuria songarica (Pall.) Maxim.
Reaumuria stocksii Boiss.
Reaumuria tatarica Jaub. & Spach
Reaumuria trigyna Maxim.
Reaumuria turkestanica Gorschk.
Reaumuria vermiculata L.

References

Tamaricaceae
Caryophyllales genera